Kenneth Eugene St. Andre (born April 28, 1947) is an American fantasy author and game designer, best known for his work with Tunnels & Trolls and Wasteland. He was born in Ogden, Utah, and has been an active member of The Science Fiction and Fantasy Writers of America since 1989.

Game design
Ken St. Andre first saw the Dungeons & Dragons role-playing game in April 1975, and after deciding that the rules did not make sense, he designed a simpler game of his own. St. Andre eventually called his game Tunnels & Trolls, and printed 100 copies of the first edition in 1975. He asked Rick Loomis of Flying Buffalo to take 40 copies to Origins that July to sell; when every copy sold, Flying Buffalo picked up the rights to T&T later that year and published a second edition under their own brand in December 1975. In addition to writing the game rules, Ken was one of the creators of solitaire adventures which allowed players to experience the game without a game master or judge. St. Andre has written many modules and stand alone adventures for Tunnels and Trolls.

St. Andre designed Starfaring, published by Flying Buffalo in 1976 as the first-ever science fiction roleplaying game. His third game, Monsters! Monsters!, was published by Metagaming Concepts in 1976, although Flying Buffalo got the rights to print a second edition in 1979. He also wrote the gamebooks Deathtrap Equalizer Dungeon and Naked Doom in 1977 after Loomis's own Buffalo Castle. He designed Chaosium's first licensed role-playing game, Stormbringer, in 1981.

With Liz Danforth and Michael Stackpole, St. Andre designed the computer roleplaying game Wasteland, published by Interplay in 1988. Tunnels & Trolls was published in a new 5.5 edition in 2005 by Flying Buffalo, with new rules, background and variants by St. Andre. Fiery Dragon Productions published a heavily revised seventh edition in 2005, with revisions by St. Andre. St. Andre produced T&T adventures such as Hot Pursuit (2007). St. Andre continued to design T&T adventures for Flying Buffalo, including Khara Kang's Random Rainbow Maze (2010), Deep Delving (2011) and A Traveler's Tale (2011).In 2008, he modified the 7th edition Tunnels and Trolls to bring the game world into modern times and turned it into a superhero RPG called Power Trip.

In 1986, Ken was also the first editor for a fan club newsletter based around the Adventure Construction Set video game, one of the rare cases of a professional designer leading gamer activities for another designer's game.

St. Andre was chosen by vote as a "famous game designer" to be featured as the king of spades in Flying Buffalo's 2014 Famous Game Designers Playing Card Deck.

In June 2018, The Academy of Adventure Gaming Arts & Design inducted St. Andre into its Hall of Fame.

Fiction
St. Andre has written various short stories and novels.

 "Old Soldiers Never" (1989), in Shrapnel: Fragments from the Inner Sphere, a Battletech anthology.
 "Turtle in the Tower" (1990), in Shadowrun: Into the Shadows edited by Jordan K. Weisman. An anthology of stories based on the Shadowrun role-playing game..
 "The Two Worst Thieves in Khazan" (1992) in "Mages Blood and Old Bones".
 "The Triple Death" (1995), in Enchanted Forests edited by Katharine Kerr and Martin H. Greenberg. An anthology of stories about magical woods..
 "Moral Invaders" (2005) in Flash Fantastic. A very short story in issue 16 of the online magazine.
 "A Thief's Day in Khazan" (2005) in Golden Heroes.
 Dragon Child (2006), by Ken St. Andre and James L. Shipman. A fantasy novel based on the Tunnels & Trolls role-playing game.
 Griffin Feathers (2008), by Ken St. Andre. A collection of linked short stories based on the Tunnels & Trolls role-playing game.
 "Introduction: Trollgod's Treasure Hunt" (2008) in Troll Tunnels, edited by Christina Lea. A collection of short sword and sorcery tales.
 "The Awakening" (2008) in Troll Tunnels, by Ken St. Andre and James L. Shipman.
 Rose of Stormgaard: A Trollworld Novel (2012), by Ken St. Andre, cover art by Steve Crompton..

Personal life
Ken St. Andre lives in Phoenix, Arizona. He and his wife Catherine initiated divorce proceedings in 2012.  They have two grown children, a daughter named Jillian and son named James. On August 27, 2010, he retired after 36 years of service to the city of Phoenix as a public librarian.

References

External links
 Ken St. Andre's SFWA web page
 Trollhallans - Facebook fan club and discussion group for Tunnels & Trolls, administered by St. Andre.  Successor to now defunct Trollhalla.com website.
 Delver's Tales - Ken's gaming blog
 Atroll's Entertainment - Ken's all purpose blog

1947 births
21st-century American novelists
American fantasy writers
American male novelists
Chaosium game designers
Living people
Role-playing game designers
American male short story writers
21st-century American short story writers
Interplay Entertainment people
21st-century American male writers